Below is a list of Pride Fighting Championships champions and title defenses:

World champions

Heavyweight Championship
Weight limit: Over

Middleweight Championship
Weight limit:  to

Lightweight Championship
Weight limit: Below

Grand Prix Winners
An asterisk (*) indicates that the tournament was also a title fight.

Records

Most wins in title bouts

Most consecutive title defenses

Multi-division champions

Simultaneous two division champions

Champions by nationality
The division champions include only linear and true champions. Interim champions who have never become linear champions will be listed as interim champions. Fighters with multiple title reigns in a specific division will also be counted once. Runners-up are not included in tournaments champions.

See also
 List of Pride events
 List of Pride FC fighters
 List of current mixed martial arts champions
 List of Bellator MMA champions
 List of EliteXC champions
 List of Invicta FC champions
 List of ONE Championship champions
 List of PFL champions
 List of Strikeforce champions
 List of UFC champions
 List of WEC champions
 Mixed martial arts weight classes

References

External links
PRIDE Title Histories

Pride Fighting Championships champions
Pride Fighting Championships Champions, List Of